Xavier Vendrell i Segura (born 15 October 1966, in San Juan Despí, Spain) is a Spanish entrepreneur. He presides over the Colombo-Catalan Chamber of Commerce and he is the chief executive officer of two entrepreneur groups Barcelona Export Group and Biomek Group.
Social demograt politician, after more than twenty years dedicated to politics on the Esquerra Republicana de Catalunya party, nowadays he is focused on the entrepreneur world and he does not hold any political responsibility.

Biography

Education
Technical in National and International Transport, he studied Electronic Industrial Engineering at the Universitat Politècnica de Catalunya between 1984 and 1988 and Political Science at the Universidad Nacional de Educación a Distancia. In 2005 he did the postgraduate about Directorate-General for Enterprise in the Universitat Oberta de Catalunya.

Professional experience
His career path begins as a salesperson in the family food distributor DISBAIX at the end of the 80s, after this he takes the management of the cooperative DIPEC which belongs to the same sector. During the early 90s he is hired by the supermarket chain Bonpreu-Esclat in order to implement the catalog sales, a pioneer bet in the distribution sector. When he starts working on the political sector, he combines the political party responsibilities with the management of the transport enterprise Amunt i Avall, until the mid-90s.

After 15 years being exclusively dedicated to the political sector (1996–2010), at the end of 2010 he assumes the management of Biomek group, a group of health enterprises dedicated to the corporal harm evaluation through the biomechanics. This group works providing solutions in this field, with an enterprise dedicated to the development and the scientific research (Biomechanics Analysis), another dedicated to the rent and sale of laboratories (Easy Beomechanics) and a third one which is dedicated to the execution of biomechanical tests (Injury Certification).

In 2011 he founded Barcelona Export Group, consultancy dedicated to the internationalization of European enterprises. This enterprise is especially focused on Latin America, but it also develops other projects in China, Pakistan and the Persian Gulf. The company is headquartered in Barcelona and in Latin America the company has its headquarters in Bogotá (Colombia).

Political experience
He has been member of the "Unió Excursionista de Catalunya" or Unión Excursionista de Cataluña (UEC) since 1976 and he has been part of the committee between 1984 and 1986. In 1988 he was president of the Asamblea de Estudiantes Independentistas de Universidad (AEIU). 
After some years of affiliation to the independent left extra-parliamentary, in 1991 he joins the Esquerra Republicana de Catalunya party, and the same year he is elected regional President, until the 1994. In 1996 he is named Organization and Finance National Secretary of the party. He reaches his highest point being General Vice-secretary from 2006 to 2008.

At institutional level, in 1995 he is elected city councillor of the Sant Joan Despí city hall, taking charge of the environment department and being representative of the Baix Llobregat regional board, where he is responsible of the Consumption and Tourism area. In his second local mandate he is named Control and Monitoring Deputy Mayor, as well as Representative in the Metropolitan Community of Municipalities, at the beginning of 1999. At the end of the same year, he is elected Member of the Parliament of Catalonia, position that he holds until the 2010, including the interval on the Catalan Government. During this period in the Government he develops the general secretary functions of the Catalan Head of Government and the Government and Public Administration Counsellor of the Catalan Government.

In 2007 he publishes a book entitled Disculpin les molèsties, in which he explains "the best kept secrets of his party", Esquerra Republicana de Catalunya and of the Catalan left government that ruled Catalonia from 2003 to the end of the 2010, through a personal point of view. He presents the book in Barcelona 8 July in 2007 in front of a thousand people, approximately.

References

1966 births
Living people
People from Sant Joan Despí
Republican Left of Catalonia politicians
Ministers of Governance and Public Administration of Catalonia
Polytechnic University of Catalonia alumni